Delta 16 is a fixed shooter video game from Finnish developer Jyri Lehtonen published by Amersoft in 1985.  It was originally released for the Commodore 16 home computer, then ported to Commodore 64 for which it was released free of charge. A total of 101 copies were sold. The game includes an automated firing mechanism that the player can activate.

References

1985 video games
Commodore 16 and Plus/4 games
Commodore 64 games
Fixed shooters
Video games developed in Finland